Dan Angel is an American film and television producer, screenwriter, story editor and showrunner.

Angel has written, co-written films and TV series including The X-Files, Goosebumps, Animorphs, Gifted Hands: The Ben Carson Story, Door to Door, R. L. Stine's The Haunting Hour: Don't Think About It, Christmas in Canaan, R. L. Stine's The Haunting Hour: The Series and Dan Vs..

His awards include Primetime Emmy Award for Outstanding Made for Television Movie and Peabody Award for Door to Door. and another Emmy Award for Outstanding Children's Series in his work on R. L. Stine's The Haunting Hour: The Series.

Education and career
Born and raised in Newport Beach, California, Angel attended UCLA School of Theater, Film and Television where he studied screenwriting and production.

In 1984, Angel began writing and producing for the sketch comedy series The Homemade Comedy Special. In 1993, Angel wrote and produced the Showtime Networks film John Carpenter Presents: Body Bags with his writing partner Billy Brown. Angel and Brown transitioned into series television, writing and story editing for the 1995–98 series Goosebumps . Angel and Brown also wrote and story edited for the  fifth season (1997–98) of The X-Files.

Angel wrote, produced and created Animorphs (1998–99), the hour-long Fox network horror anthology series Night Visions (2001–02), and the series Young Blades (2005).

In 2002, Dan produced the film adaptation Door to Door, the memoir of Bill Porter Angel received a Peabody Award, a Critic's Choice Award, and an AFI Award. Angel later produced Gifted Hands: The Ben Carson Story  and Hallmark Channel's Christmas in Canaan.  He also produced direct-to-DVD films and network television series.  He was executive producer of  R. L. Stine's The Haunting Hour, and Dan Vs.

Angle has served as partner and Chief creative officer of The Hatchery, LLC production company since 2003.

Personal life
Angel is married to Cindy Angel. The couple lives in Burbank, California and have daughters Jessica and Nikki, and son Matt Angel, who is an actor.

Selected filmography

Telefilms
John Carpenter Presents: Body Bags (1993) (writer, executive producer)
Door to Door (2002) (executive producer)
R. L. Stine's The Haunting Hour: Don't Think About It (2007) (writer, executive producer)
Gifted Hands: The Ben Carson Story (2009) (executive producer)
Christmas in Canaan (2009) (executive producer)

Television Series
The Homemade Comedy Special (1984) (writer, producer)
Goosebumps (1995–1998) (writer, story editor)
The X-Files (1997–1998) (writer, story editor)
Animorphs (1998–1999) (writer, supervising producer)
The Fearing Mind (2000) (executive producer)
Night Visions (2001–2002) (writer, executive producer)
Young Blades (2005) (writer, executive producer)
The Zula Patrol (2005) (executive producer)
Dan Vs. (2011–2013) (executive producer)
R. L. Stine's The Haunting Hour: The Series (2010-2014) (writer, executive producer)

Awards
Leo Awards Nominee – R.L. Stine's Monsterville: Cabinet of Souls – Best Television Movie – 2016

Emmy Awards Nominee – R.L. Stine's Monsterville: Cabinet of Souls – Outstanding Special Class Special – 2016
 
Emmy Awards – Winner – R.L. Stine's The Hauntng Hour – Outstanding Children's Series – 2015

Emmy Awards – Nominee – Spooksville – Outstanding Children's Series – 2015

Emmy Awards – Nominee – Spooksville – Best Writing In a Children's Series –2015 
 
WGC – Nominee – R.L. Stine's The Haunting Hour – Best Writing in a Children's Series – Episode: Good 
will Towards Men – 2015 
 
Emmy Awards – Winner – R.L. Stine's The Haunting Hour – Outstanding Children's Series – 2014

Emmy Awards – Nominee – R.L. Stine's The Haunting Hour – Best Writing In a Children's Series – 2014

Emmy Awards – Nominee – Outstanding Special Class Best Animated Series – Dan Vs. – 2014

Emmy Awards – Winner – R.L. Stine's The Haunting Hour – Outstanding Children's Series – 2013

Emmy Awards – Nominee – Outstanding Special Class Best Animated Series – Dan Vs. – 2013

Emmy Awards – Nominee – R.L. Stine's The Haunting Hour – Best Writing In a Children's Series – 2013

TCA Award – Television Critics Association  – Nominee – R.L. Stine's The Haunting Hour – Outstanding 
Achievement In Youth Programming – 2011

BFCA Critics Choice Awards – Nominee – Best Picture Made For Television – Gifted Hands – 2009

WGA Awards – Nominee – R.L. Stine's The Haunting Hour Movie – Best Writing Children's Long form – 
2008

Critics Choice Awards – Winner – Best Picture – Door To Door – 2003  
 
Emmy Awards – Winner – Door To Door – Best Made For TV Movie – 2003 
 
Peabody Award Winner – Best Picture – Door To Door – 2003 
 
Producers Guild Awards – Winner – Diversity Award – Door To Door – 2003 
 
WGA Awards – Winner – Goosebumps – Best Writing Children's TV – 1997

References

External links

 
 The Hatchery, LLC Website

Living people
American film producers
People from Newport Beach, California
UCLA Film School alumni
Year of birth missing (living people)